Lake at Falls is a lake in Carbon County, Montana, in the United States.

Lake at Falls was named from the two waterfalls which flow into it.

See also
List of lakes in Montana

References

Lakes of Montana
Lakes of Carbon County, Montana